Alan McCulloch may refer to:

 Alan McCulloch (politician), leader of the One New Zealand political party
 Alan McCulloch (footballer), Scottish footballer
 Alan McLeod McCulloch, Australian art critic and art historian

See also
 Allan Riverstone McCulloch, Australian ichthyologist